HMS Newfoundland was a  light cruiser of the Royal Navy. Named after the Dominion of Newfoundland, she participated in the Second World War and was later sold to the Peruvian Navy.

The hospital ship  was a different ship, although also torpedoed in the Mediterranean in 1943.

Early career
Newfoundland was built by Swan Hunter and launched 19 December 1941 by the wife of the then British Minister of Labour, Ernest Bevin. The ship was completed in December 1942 and commissioned the next month.

After commissioning Newfoundland joined the 10th Cruiser Squadron, Home Fleet. Early in 1943 the ship became flagship of the 15th Cruiser Squadron, Mediterranean. On the night of 13/14 July 1943, during Sicily Campaign, she provided effective support for 1st Parachute Brigade helping to secure the Primasole Bridge, linking Catania with Syra.

One crewman was killed in the attack. Her rudder having been blown off, temporary repairs were carried out at Malta. Later, steering by her propellers only, and with the assistance of "jury rigged" sails between her funnels, she steamed to the Boston Navy Yard for major repairs.

In 1944 the ship was re-commissioned for service in the Far East. While at Alexandria an exploding air vessel occurred in one of the torpedoes in the port tubes which caused severe damage and one casualty. The repairs delayed her arrival in the Far East for service with the British Pacific Fleet (BPF). Newfoundland went to New Guinea to support the Australian 6th Division in the Aitape-Wewak campaign. On 14 June 1945, as part of a BPF task group, Newfoundland attacked the Japanese naval base at Truk, in the Caroline Islands during Operation Inmate.

On 6 July Newfoundland left the forward base of Manus in the Admiralty Islands with other ships of the BPF to take part in the Allied campaign against the Japanese home islands. On 9 August she took part in a bombardment of the Japanese city of Kamaishi. Newfoundland was part of a British Empire force which took control of the naval base at Yokosuka.

The ship was present in Tokyo Bay when the Instrument of Surrender was signed aboard the US battleship , on 2 September 1945. Newfoundland was then assigned the task of repatriating British Empire prisoners of war.

She returned to Great Britain in December 1946.

Postwar
Newfoundland was initially in reserve, and was used as a training ship as part of the stokers' training establishment , before starting a 20-month reconstruction at Plymouth in 1951.  Recommissioned on 5 November 1952, she became flagship of the 4th Cruiser Squadron in the East Indies. The cabinet of Sri Lanka met on board her during the Hartal of 1953. From December 1953 Newfoundland underwent a three-month refit at Singapore before transferring to the Far East Station, shelling Malayan National Liberation Army targets near Penang in June 1954 when on passage to the Far East.

Aware of tensions between Britain and Egypt that would lead to the Suez Crisis, Domiat refused and opened fire on the cruiser, causing some damage and casualties. The cruiser, with the destroyer , then returned fire and sank her opponent, rescuing 69 survivors from the wreckage. One man from the Newfoundland was killed and five were wounded.

Newfoundland then returned to the Far East until paid off to the reserve at Portsmouth on 24 June 1959. The cruiser was hulked in 1979 and used as a static training ship in Callao, before being decommissioned and scrapped later that year.

Notes

References

External links

 WWII cruisers
 HMS Newfoundland at Uboat.net

 

Ships built on the River Tyne
1941 ships
World War II cruisers of the United Kingdom
Cold War cruisers of the United Kingdom
Maritime incidents in July 1943

it:BAP Almirante Grau (CL-81)#HMS Newfoundland (59)